James J. Fitzpatrick Stadium is a 6,000 seat multi-purpose outdoor stadium in Portland, Maine, United States. It is located between Interstate 295, Hadlock Field baseball stadium, King Middle School, and the Portland Exposition Building. It is located across the street from Deering Oaks. Formerly known as Portland Stadium, it was renamed in 1989 to honor James J. Fitzpatrick, one of the most respected figures in Maine athletic history.

Renovations
In 2001, the stadium underwent a $1.4 million renovation project that included replacing the grass with FieldTurf, a new rubberized track and rest rooms. In November 2010, a $950,000 renovation project began to replace the bleachers. Modeled after Memorial Stadium at Deering High School, the bleachers hold 3,800 seats on the home side and 2,500 seats on the away side and have a dark blue backing in honor of Portland High School's colors. The Portland High School Bulldogs is the primary tenant. The city of Portland is paying for renovation out of the capital improvement fund.

Events
Fitzpatrick Stadium is the home field for the Portland High School Bulldogs, Southern Maine Raging Bulls, and Maine Tomcats of the New England Football League, state high school football championships, City of Portland high schools lacrosse league, Maine Elite Men's Lacrosse League, 2005 state high school lacrosse championship, and Maine Senior Games.
The facility has also occasionally hosted University of Maine Black Bears football games and local and high school soccer and track events. It was formerly home to the Portland Pilots from 1946 to 1949.

In 1960, Democratic presidential nominee John F. Kennedy spoke at Portland Stadium as part of his presidential campaign.

References

External links 
Fitzy
FieldTurf chosen to replace grass at Fitzpatrick Stadium
University of Maine Black Bears to play at Fitzpatrick
 Fitzpatrick Stadium the right spot for high school championships

American football venues in Maine
Sports venues in Portland, Maine
High school football venues in the United States
Maine Black Bears football
Lacrosse venues in the United States
Soccer venues in Maine
College football venues